Thailand was the host nation for the 1978 Asian Games in Bangkok on 9–20 December 1978. Thailand ended the games at 42 overall medals including 11 gold medals.

Nations at the 1978 Asian Games
1978
Asian Games